He's My Brother She's My Sister is a band formed in Los Angeles, California. This folk group has been influenced by a wide range of genres ranging from pop, country, and punk among others.

Formed by actual brother-sister duo Robert and Rachel Kolar, the group now consists of five members. The band features a Tap Dancing Drummer, Lauren Brown, known for inventing her own unique style of full body percussion. 
Rachel Kolar (Vocals & Percussion)
Rob Kolar (Vocals & Guitar)
Lauren Brown (Tap Dancing Drummer)
Oliver 'Oliwa' Newell (Upright Bass)
Ryan Richter (Slide Guitar)

They have played over 150 shows and their first full-length album, Nobody Dances in This Town, was released on October 9, 2012.

Band member Rob Kolar currently scores The Detour on TBS, which also features the music of He's My Brother She's My Sister. The Detour made its television debut on April 11, 2016.

Discography

Studio albums
2012: Nobody Dances in This Town

EPs
2010: He's My Brother She's My Sister

Singles
2012: What Goes On
2012: How'm I Gonna Get Back Home (Live)
2012: Straight Shooter
2011: Escape Tonight
2010: Merry Christmas Everybody

See also
KOLARS

References

External links

Musical groups from Los Angeles
American folk musical groups